Vernix is a commune in the Manche department in Normandy in north-western France. Vernix is the home of 155 people (2018). Vernix is part of the arrondissement of Avranches and the canton of Isigny-le-Buat.

See also
Communes of the Manche department

References

Communes of Manche